The Thai Ambassador in Yangon is the official representative of the Government in Bangkok to the Government of Myanmar.

List of representatives

References 

 
Myanmar
Thailand